Daggoo Peak is a rocky peak,  high, situated in southeastern Aristotle Mountains at the north side of the mouth of Flask Glacier,  west-southwest of Tashtego Point on the east side of Graham Land. It was surveyed and photographed by the Falkland Islands Dependencies Survey in 1947, and named by the UK Antarctic Place-Names Committee in 1956 after Flask's harpooner on the Pequod in Herman Melville's Moby-Dick; or, The White Whale.

References 

Mountains of Graham Land
Oscar II Coast